Lavaggi is an Italian surname. Notable people with the surname include:

Carlos Martín Alzugaray Lavaggi, Cuban scouting pioneer
Giovanni Lavaggi (born 1958), Italian racing driver

See also
Lavaggi LS1

Italian-language surnames